Koporokendie Na  is a village and commune of the Cercle of Koro in the Mopti Region of Mali.

References

External links
.

Communes of Mopti Region